Donja Bukovica is a village in the municipality of Maglaj, Bosnia and Herzegovina.

Demographics 
According to the 2013 census, its population was nil, down from 151 in 1992.

References

Populated places in Maglaj